"Lead, Kindly Light, Amid the encircling gloom" is a hymn with words written in 1833 by Saint John Henry Newman as a poem titled "the Pillar of the Cloud", which was first published in the British Magazine in 1834, and republished in Lyra Apostolica in 1836.

It is usually sung to the tune Sandon by Charles H. Purday, Lux Benigna composed by John Bacchus Dykes in 1865.  It was however originally published by Oxford University Press in the university city to the hymn tune Alberta by William H. Harris; or alternatively as a choral anthem by Sir John Stainer (1886). Arthur Sullivan also did a setting, Lux in Tenebris, which Ian Bradley praises as a "much more sensitive and honest setting of Newman's ambiguity and expressions of doubt" than Dykes’s "steady, reassuring" rhythms.

As a young priest, Newman became sick while in Italy and was unable to travel for almost three weeks.  In his own words:

Before starting from my inn, I sat down on my bed and began to sob bitterly. My servant, who had acted as my nurse, asked what ailed me. I could only answer, "I have a work to do in England."  I was aching to get home, yet for want of a vessel I was kept at Palermo for three weeks. I began to visit the churches, and they calmed my impatience, though I did not attend any services. At last I got off in an orange boat, bound for Marseilles. We were becalmed for whole week in the Straits of Bonifacio, and it was there that I wrote the lines, Lead, Kindly Light, which have since become so well known.

Notable occasions relating to hymn

The largest mining disaster in the Durham Coalfield in England was at West Stanley Colliery, known locally as "The Burns Pit", when 168 men and boys lost their lives as the result of two underground explosions at 3:45pm on Tuesday 16 February 1909. In the Towneley Seam 63 lay dead, in the Tilley Seam 18 lay dead, in the Busty Seam 33 lay dead and in the Brockwell Seam 48 lay dead. But incredibly, there were still men alive underground. A group of 34 men and boys in the Tilley Seam had found a pocket of clean air. They were led by Deputy Mark Henderson. A few of them panicked and left the group, they died instantly after inhaling the poison gas. The remainder sat in almost total darkness, when one of them began humming the Hymn "Lead Kindly Light". In no time at all, the rest of the miners joined in with the words, "Lead kindly light amidst the encircling gloom, lead thou me on, The night is dark, and I am far from home". This was probably sung to the tune "Sandon" by C. H. Purday, popular with miners in the Durham coalfield. Before the hymn ended, young Jimmy Gardner died of injuries. These 26 men were rescued after 14 hours, four others were later rescued.

"Lead, Kindly Light" was sung by Betsie ten Boom, sister of Corrie ten Boom, and other women as they were led by the S.S. Guards to the Ravensbrück concentration camp during the Holocaust.

"Lead, Kindly Light" was sung by a soloist, Marion Wright, on the RMS Titanic during a hymn-singing gathering led by the Rev. Ernest C. Carter, shortly before the ocean liner struck an iceberg on April 14, 1912. The hymn was also sung aboard one of the Titanic'''s lifeboats when the rescue ship Carpathia was sighted the following morning. It was suggested by one of the occupants, Noëlle, Countess of Rothes.

On one occasion in February 1915, "Lead, Kindly Light" was sung by a group of British troops to the accompaniment of nearby artillery fire on the Western Front during the First World War at services held before going into the trenches the following day.

"Lead, Kindly Light" is the motto for the Cambridge High School, Abu Dhabi, United Arab Emirates; Our Own English High School, United Arab Emirates; The Little Flower Higher Secondary School, Salem, Tamil Nadu, India; Saundararaja Vidhyalaya, Dindigul, Tamil Nadu, India; Mangalam College of Engineering, Ettumanoor, Kerala, India; St. Thomas Public School, Pune, Maharashtra, India; Sri Kumaran Children's Home, Bangalore, Karnataka, India and for De Paul School, Kuravilangad, Kerala (Malayalam translation).

The hymn is referred to in Chapter LVI titled 'Beauty in Loneliness – After All' from Thomas Hardy's novel Far From The Madding Crowd.

The hymn was also a favourite of Mahatma Gandhi and is mentioned at the Gandhi Museum in Madurai, Tamil Nadu.

Verses
Edward Henry Bickersteth (later Bishop of Exeter) added a fourth 'pirate verse' for the poem's republication in the Hymnal Companion'' in 1870. Newman was not pleased, writing to the publishers: "It is not that the verse is not both in sentiment and language graceful and good, but I think you will at once see how unwilling an author must be to subject himself to the inconvenience of that being ascribed to him which is not his own." This verse is not commonly now included as part of the hymn.

See also
 Pillar of Cloud

References

External links

Sheet music and recordings from the Church of Jesus Christ of Latter-day Saints website

English Christian hymns
19th-century hymns